Manuel Kanté (born 21 August 1986) is a French-born Malian former professional footballer who played as a defender or defensive midfielder.

Career

Youth
Born in Paris, Kanté attended College Anatole France Drancy Accession, and was a member of the youth teams of French league sides Red Star 93 and AS Beauvais, before turning professional in 2004 with Falkirk.

Professional
Kanté began his career in Scotland, playing three games for Falkirk before moving to Portugal to play for Pampilhosa.

He subsequently played professionally in Croatia for NK Gorica and NK Varteks., in Greece for Proodeftiki, in Portugal for Abrantes, and had a brief stint as a triallist with Southend United in England.

He signed for USSF Division 2 Professional League newcomers AC St. Louis in February 2010,

In January 2011 he moved to FC Baulmes and played until the summer in the Swiss 1. Liga.

In summer 2011 he moved to Atromitos Yeroskipou where he stayed until the end of the season.

In summer 2012 he signed for APEP.

In January 2015, Kanté joined Swiss side FC Fribourg from Fort Lauderdale-based club Floridians FC.

International
Despite being born in France, and although he did not yet featured for any national team at any level, Kanté expressed a preference to play for the Mali national team.

References

External links
 
 AC St. Louis bio

1986 births
Living people
French people of Malian descent
French footballers
Malian footballers
Association football defenders
Association football midfielders
Footballers from Paris
USSF Division 2 Professional League players
Cypriot Second Division players
Red Star F.C. players
AS Beauvais Oise players
Southend United F.C. players
FC Pampilhosa players
Falkirk F.C. players
Proodeftiki F.C. players
NK Varaždin players
AC St. Louis players
Atromitos Yeroskipou players
FC Vevey United players
Malian expatriate sportspeople in France
Expatriate footballers in Greece
Malian expatriate sportspeople in Greece
Expatriate footballers in France
Malian expatriate sportspeople in the United Kingdom
Expatriate footballers in Scotland
Malian expatriate sportspeople in Croatia
Expatriate footballers in Croatia
Malian expatriate sportspeople in Switzerland
Expatriate footballers in Switzerland
Malian expatriate sportspeople in Cyprus
Expatriate footballers in Cyprus